The 1999 UMass Minutemen football team represented the University of Massachusetts Amherst in the 1999 NCAA Division I-AA football season as a member of the Atlantic 10 Conference. The team was coached by Mark Whipple and played its home games at Warren McGuirk Alumni Stadium in Hadley, Massachusetts. The Minutemen entered the season with high expectations as defending National Champions, but struggled out of the gate as they lost three of their first four games. The Minutemen did not lose again until the second round of the NCAA Playoffs against the eventual champions, Georgia Southern. UMass finished the season with a record of 9–4 overall and 8–1 in conference play.

Schedule

References

UMass
UMass Minutemen football seasons
Atlantic 10 Conference football champion seasons
UMass Minutemen football